Cerina, Croatia is a village in the municipality Čazma, Bjelovar-Bilogora County in Croatia. It is connected by the D26 highway. According to the 2001 census, there are 125 inhabitants, in 46 family households.

References 

Populated places in Bjelovar-Bilogora County